AMTD may refer to:

 AMTD Digital, a Hong Kong–based financial technology firm
 Amplified mycobacterium tuberculosis direct test, a test for Tuberculous meningitis